Pierre Desforges Sam (23 March 1925 – 16 May 2019) was a Haitian diplomat.

Life and career
Desforges Sam was born in Saint-Louis-du-Nord on 23 March 1925. 

From 1945 to 1953, he was Project manager of the United States Operations Mission, Gonâve, Saint-Raphaël, Haiti.
From 1953 to 1955, he was National supervisor United States Operations Mission Extension, Port-au-Prince.
From 1955 to 1962, he was Project manager of the Service Coopératif Interaméricain de Production Agricole in Haiti.
From 1962 to 1963, he was Regional officer United Nations, Rome. 
From 1963 to 1980, he was Extension officer Governor of Haiti, Africa, South American, Africa.
From 1981 to 1982, he was Minister of Planning Governor of Haiti, Port-au-Prince.
He was a senior consultant, private consultant, manager employed from the United States Agency for International Development/Society d'Etudes et de Mise en Valeur, Haiti.

He died in Pétion-Ville on 16 May 2019, at the age of 94.

References

1925 births
2019 deaths
Ambassadors of Haiti to the United States
Haitian expatriates in Italy
People from Nord-Ouest (department)